Carl Friedrich was a German-American professor and political theorist.

Carl Friedrich may also refer to:

 Carl Friedrich Abel (1723–1787), German composer
 Carl Friedrich Bruch (1789–1857), German ornithologist
 Carl Friedrich Christian Fasch (1736–1800), German composer and harpsichordist
 Carl Friedrich Gauss (1777–1855), German mathematician and scientist
 Carl Friedrich Goerdeler (1884–1945), conservative German politician
 Carl Friedrich Heinrich Credner (1809–1876), German geologist
 Carl Friedrich Heinrich Graf von Wylich und Lottum (1767–1841), Prussian infantry general and minister of the State
 Carl Friedrich Meerwein (1737–1810), German civil engineer and aviation pioneer
 Carl Friedrich Nagelsbach (1806–1859), German classical scholar
 Karl Friedrich Otto Westphal (1833–1890), German neurologist and psychiatrist
 Carl Friedrich Philipp von Martius (1794–1868), German botanist and explorer
 Carl Friedrich Richard Förster (1825–1902), German ophthalmologist
 Carl Friedrich Roewer (1881–1963), German arachnologist
 Carl Friedrich von Ledebour (1785–1851), German-Estonian botanist
 Carl Friedrich von Siemens (1872–1941), German entrepreneur and politician
 Carl Friedrich von Weizsäcker (1912–2007), German physicist and philosopher
 Carl Friedrich Wenzel (circa 1740–1793), German chemist and metallurgist
 Carl Friedrich Wilhelm, 1st Prince of Leiningen (1724–1807), German nobleman
 Carl Friedrich Wilhelm Alfred Fleckeisen (1820–1899), German philologist and critic
 Carl Friedrich Zelter (1758–1832), German composer, conductor and teacher of music
 Carl Gustav Friedrich Hasselbach (1809–1882), member of the Prussian House of Lords
 Georg Amadeus Carl Friedrich Naumann (1797–1873), German mineralogist and geologist
 Hans Carl Friedrich von Mangoldt (1854–1925), German mathematician
 Johann Carl Friedrich Dauthe (1746–1816), German architect and etcher
 Johann Carl Friedrich Rellstab (1759–1813), German composer, writer, music publisher, and critic
 Otto Carl Friedrich Westphal (1800–1879), prominent physician

See also
 Karl Friedrich (disambiguation)
 Carl Frederick (given name)
 Friedrich Carl (disambiguation)